The National Live Music Awards of 2019 are the 4th annual National Live Music Awards.

The nominations were announced on 22 October 2020 and the awards ceremony was held on 4 December 2020. For the first time ever, all State and Territory categories (except the "All Ages Achievement" award) are public voted.

Live Legend recipient
 Deborah Conway

National awards
Nominations and wins below.

Live Act of the Year

Live Voice of the Year

Best New Act

Live Bassist of the Year

Live Drummer of the Year

Live Guitarist of the Year

Live Instrumentalist of the Year

Live Blues and Roots Act of the Year

Live Classical Act of the Year

Live Country Act of the Year

 Note: This was a tie.

Live Electronic Act (or DJ) of the Year

Live Hard Rock Act of the Year

Live Hip Hop Act of the Year

Live Indie / Rock Act of the Year

Live Jazz Act of the Year

Live Pop Act of the Year

Live R&B or Soul Act of the Year

Best Live Music Festival or Event

Best Live Music Photographer of the Year

International Live Achievement (Group)

International Live Achievement (Solo)

Industry Achievement

State and Territory awards
Note: Wins only.

References

2019 in Australian music
2019 music awards
National Live Music Awards